Sir John Godard (c. 1346 – 1392), of Bransholme, Yorkshire was a Member of Parliament for Yorkshire in 1386 and 1391.

References

1346 births
1392 deaths
14th-century English people
English MPs 1386
English MPs 1391
Members of the Parliament of England for constituencies in Yorkshire